Judson John "Fabio" Birza (born June 12, 1989) is an American model, best known as the winner of Survivor: Nicaragua. At age 21 at the time of the game, he is currently the youngest ever person to win the show. He was nicknamed Fabio by one of his tribemates on Survivor due to his resemblance to Italian fashion icon Fabio Lanzoni.  Birza is a native of Lake St. Louis, Missouri, and graduated from Wentzville Holt High School in 2007.

Survivor 
As the second youngest player on Survivor: Nicaragua, he was placed on the "younger" La Flor tribe. He became the tribe's resident goofball, sending his tribemates to endless laughter at every opportunity often by accidentally hurting himself, making jokes, or reinforcing his own stereotype as a blonde surfer. Birza's tribe mates started calling him Fabio, despite Birza's real name being Jud. Yet he kept the nickname afterwards. The one exception to his humor was NaOnka Mixon, whom Birza had a conflict with after Mixon took Birza’s spare pair of socks. This led to a tirade from Mixon during their first Tribal Council, outright stating that she hated him and his antics. Birza privately admitted that although it was his real personality, he planned to use it as a strategy, both by making himself socially popular among the castaways, while also fooling them into thinking that he was not intelligent enough to be a strategic threat, thus giving them more incentive to keep him around.

Early on, Birza was an alliance outsider. He initially sided with Shannon Elkins, Alina Wilson, Kelly Bruno, and Ben "Benry" Henry. Elkins wanted Brenda Lowe eliminated because of her perceived deviousness, but due to Elkins's aggressiveness at their first Tribal Council, two of their allies (Henry and Bruno) eventually voted against Elkins. Afterwards, Birza's remaining alliance partners were in line for elimination, though he remained indispensable because of his strength in challenges. Strategically, he was perceived as somewhat clueless. The negative perception was reflected in his voting history, where his votes barely eliminated other players.

After a Day 12 tribe swap, Birza, along with Lowe, Bruno, Matthew "Sash" Lenahan, and "Purple Kelly" Shinn, remained on the La Flor tribe. There, he became friends with the new members Jane Bright, Marty Piombo, and Jill Behm. At the Day 15 Double Tribal Council twist, Behm (the next intended target) won individual immunity. Lenahan and Lowe shifted their plan to a split vote between Piombo, who had a Hidden Immunity Idol, and Bruno, who was a Jury threat because of her athleticism despite her prosthetic leg. Birza nearly endangered the plan by gaining the trust of Piombo, who fabricated a story of him being a chess grandmaster. However, Birza stuck to the plan and voted out Bruno, although Piombo's story was his incentive for voting her off. Three days later, Birza and 11 others would comprise the merged Libertad tribe.

Birza would then either join several (albeit failed) alliances, or cast his votes against random people, and would continue to act clueless about voting dynamics. After Wilson's elimination (where Birza won Immunity), there was an all-male rebellion led by Piombo, which was eventually thwarted after Lenahan and Chase Rice sided with the women. Though Birza was deemed socially clueless for the most part, he was kept for a longer time. However, when the remaining castaways realized that this strategy would work because he did not hurt anybody's feelings (particularly those of the Jury members), winning Immunity Challenges became Birza's last resort. He went on to win the last three consecutive Immunity Challenges, keeping himself safe from the vote, while the formed alliances turned on each other. After winning the Day 38 Immunity Challenge, Birza, along with Lenahan and Rice, made it to the Final Tribal Council. While Rice and Lenahan were lambasted for being indecisive and "spineless" respectively, Birza was seen as strategically clueless, though he rebutted that he nevertheless back-stabbed no one and winning several challenges proved him worthy of winning. In the end, it was Birza who won the five votes of Dan Lembo, Henry, Mixon, Shinn, and Piombo. Rice was the runner-up with four votes, while Lenahan received zero. Thus, Birza became the Sole Survivor and won the $1 million prize by a 5-4-0 margin, which was the closest margin of victory on Survivor since Bob Crowley's victory in Survivor: Gabon. Birza also eclipsed Survivor: The Amazon'''s Jenna Morasca's record of youngest person to ever win Survivor.

 Personal life 

Birza worked as a fashion model. He was signed to "Next Model Management, New York" and "Mother Model Management" and has previously modeled for "Chosen Model Management". He was dropped from his modeling companies, and pursued a new career. He has appeared in campaigns for Abercrombie and Fitch and L'Uomo Vogue, among others.

He has also appeared on the cover of City of Lost Souls, the fifth book in Cassandra Clare's Mortal Instruments books.

Birza has also acted as "Charlie" in director David DeCoteau's horror film A Dream Within A Dream, also known as 1313 Nightmare Mansion. The film premiered on Video on Demand (VOD) on February 1, 2011.

On January 19, 2011, Birza was arrested by police in Santa Monica, California, for skateboarding in the street and on suspicion of being under the influence of a controlled substance. All charges against Birza were dropped.

Birza has a small role in the 2012 documentary film Burning Man: Metropolis.

Birza is the drummer in Space Funk Odyssey, an electro-dance/rock band from Venice, California.

References

External links
Jud Birza biography for Survivor: Nicaragua'' at CBS.com

1989 births
Winners in the Survivor franchise
Male models from Missouri
American rock drummers
Living people
People from Lake St. Louis, Missouri
Survivor (American TV series) winners
21st-century American drummers